Novotoryalsky District (U Torjal kundem) is an administrative and municipal district (raion), one of the fourteen in the Mari El Republic, Russia. It is located in the northeast of the republic. Its administrative center is the urban locality (an urban-type settlement) of Novy Toryal. As of the 2010 Census, the total population of the district was 17,124, with the population of Novy Toryal accounting for 38.7% of that number.

Administrative and municipal status
Within the framework of administrative divisions, Novotoryalsky District is one of the fourteen in the republic. It is divided into 1 urban-type settlement (an administrative division with the administrative center in the urban-type settlement (inhabited locality) of Novy Toryal) and 4 rural okrugs, all of which comprise 151 rural localities. As a municipal division, the district is incorporated as Novotoryalsky Municipal District. Novy Toryal Urban-Type Settlement is incorporated into an urban settlement, and the four rural okrugs are incorporated into four rural settlements within the municipal district. The urban-type settlement of Novy Toryal serves as the administrative center of both the administrative and municipal district.

References

Notes

Sources



Districts of Mari El